Charles-François Racot de Grandval (25 September 1710 – 23 October 1784) was an 18th-century French actor and playwright.

Some works 
1732: Zaïre (actor)
1732: Le Bord.., ou le Jean-F..tre puni (with Anne Claude de Caylus)
1749: Agathe ou la Chaste princesse
1749: Le Pot de chambre cassé (également attribué à son père)
1750: Sirop-au-cul ou l'Heureuse délivrance
1755: Le Tempérament
1773: La nouvelle Messaline

See also 
 Troupe of the Comédie-Française in 1752

External links 
 Charles-François Racot de Grandval on data.bnf.fr

Writers from Paris
1710 births
1784 deaths
18th-century French male actors
French male stage actors
18th-century French dramatists and playwrights
Troupe of the Comédie-Française